Ugnė Lazdauskaitė (born 9 October 2002) is a Lithuanian footballer plays as a forward for FC Sion Feminin and the Lithuania national team.

Career

Vilnius FM-JL Stars 
Ugnė Lazdauskaitė started her senior career in the Vilnius FM-JL Stars team at age of 12 on 17-05-2015

MFA Žalgiris 
From 2016 was a member of MFA Žalgiris - MRU.

2016: played 13 games for the 1st and reserve team and scored 3 goals.

2017: played 26 games for the 1st and reserve team and scored 5 goals.

2018: played 18 games for the 1st and reserve team and scored 5 goals.

2019: played 11 games for the 1st team and scored 7 goals. Loaned to Kauno Žalgiris for second part of season. Played 7 games and scored 2 goals and became Lithuanian vice-champion for the 1st time.

2020: changed position from midfielder to forward. Played 20 games for the 1st team and scored 28 goals and 14 games for reserve team and scored 35 goals and became Lithuanian vice-champion for the 2nd time.

2021: played 20 games for the 1st team and scored 28 goals and became Lithuanian vice-champion for 3rd time in a row.

After a successful 2021  season received offers from foreign football clubs.

Roma Calcio Feminille 
On 1 February 2022 announced, that player became a member of Roma Calcio Femminile.

Ugnė Lazdauskaitė played 15 games in Femminile Serie B and scored 6 goals and made 1 assist. She became team top scorer.

FC Sion Feminin 
On 27 August 2022 Ugnė Lazdauskaitė joined Swiss club FC Sion Feminin.

Awards 
Ugnė Lazdauskaitė was named Lithuanian Footballer of the Year 2022 in January 2023.

International career
Ugnė Lazdauskaitė played for Lithuania WU-15 3 games and won Baltic Cup in 2016.

Ugnė Lazdauskaitė represented Lithuania at the 2018 UEFA Women's Under-17 Championship. She played 28 games for Lithuania WU-17 and scored 2 goals, won Baltic Cup in 2018.

She played 5 games for Lithuania WU-19 and won Baltic Cup in 2019.

Ugnė Lazdauskaitė has been capped for the Lithuania national team, appearing for the team during UEFA Women's Euro 2022 Qualifications on 8 November 2019.  She scored her first international goal against Jordan at the 2021 Armenia International Friendly Tournament on 7 April 2021. Baltic cup winner in 2021.

She played 10 games in FIFA World Cup 2023 Qualifiers for Lithuania NT, scored 3 goals, and became the team's top scorer.

International goals

References

External links
Ugnė Lazdauskaitė at YouTube
Ugnė Lazdauskaitė at Instagram
 
 

2002 births
Living people
Lithuanian women's footballers
Footballers from Vilnius
Women's association football midfielders
Lithuania women's youth international footballers
Lithuania women's international footballers